Meycauayan station is a former railway station located on the North Main Line in Bulacan, Philippines. The station was once part of the line until its discontinuation in 1988. It is currently being rebuilt as part of the first phase of the North–South Commuter Railway. The old station will also be preserved.

History 
This station has been used for passenger and freight transportation by the Philippine National Railways (PNR) and its precursors in the past.

The station was first closed in 1988, but was reopened in the 1990 under the Metrotren project. During the 1991 eruption of Mount Pinatubo, the Meycauayan Railroad Bridge was destroyed and the station became the terminus, until services were altogether abandoned. It was abandoned when the North Main Line ceased operations in 1997. The old station house still stands but is in a state of deterioration and constantly guarded due to informal settlers.

The station was to be rebuilt as a part of the Northrail project, which involved the upgrading of the existing single track to an elevated dual-track system, converting the rail gauge from narrow gauge to standard gauge, and linking Manila to Malolos in Bulacan and further on to Angeles City, Clark Special Economic Zone and Clark International Airport. The project commenced in 2007; the station is in the middle of a clearing where railtracks once were laid. The railway's construction was repeatedly halted then discontinued in 2011, after allegations of overpricing.

Gallery

References

Philippine National Railways stations
Railway stations in Bulacan
Proposed railway stations in the Philippines